The Aprilia SR50 is a scooter built by Aprilia.

History
Introduced in 1992, more than 800,000 units have been sold, bucking the trend for less use of two-stroke engines. Aprilia claims several firsts for the SR50 in the scooter market, including 13 inch wheels, liquid cooling, double disc braking, and a direct injection engine.

The performance-oriented suspension, tires, and engine are consistent with its styling. Colours and graphics vary by country. The digital instrument panel gives readings for speed, clock, odometer, trip counter, fuel level, coolant temperature and battery voltage.

The SR50 has used a variety of engines, sourced from Morini, Piaggio and Minarelli. It conforms to EURO 3 emission standards. The DiTech model used an injection engine, with technology from Orbital. The current model uses a Dell'Orto waterbottle. The powerful engines allow reaching very high speeds for a scooter, the SR50 can reach 90 km/h in its standard configuration after being derestricted.

DITECH two-stroke engine
The SR50 DITECH uses the Synerject gasoline direct injection (GDI) system developed jointly by the Orbital Corporation and Siemens AG. After the port is closed and the air is compressed by the piston, gasoline is injected by an atomizer like a spray nozzle mixed with and propelled by the highly compressed air, into the main combustion chamber where, after the injection port closes, and the piston is still rising, it is ignited in the compressed main charge of air. The use of direct injection and stratified charge allows the DITECH engine to meet Euro 2 standards.

References

External links

 Official Website
 aprilia.com
 apriliaforum.com

Motor scooters
SR50
Motorcycles introduced in 1992